The 1985 Tour de Suisse was the 49th edition of the Tour de Suisse cycle race and was held from 11 June to 20 June 1985. The race started in Locarno and finished in Zürich. The race was won by Phil Anderson of the Panasonic team.

General classification

References

1985
Tour de Suisse
1985 Super Prestige Pernod International